Bothriolepididae is a family of antiarch placoderms, known from the Emsian, to Famennian.

Taxonomy 
The cladogram is from "Bothriolepid antiarchs (Vertebrata, Placodermi) from the Devonian of the north-western part of the East European Platform".

References 

Antiarchi
Devonian fish
Prehistoric fish families